José Miguel de Carvajal-Vargas y Manrique de Lara Polanco, 2nd Duke of San Carlos, (8 May 1771 in Lima, Perú – 27 September 1828 in París), 6th conde de Castillejo and 9th conde del Puerto, 10th "Correo Mayor de las Indias", was the son of Mariano Joaquín de Carvajal-Vargas y Brun, 8th conde del Puerto, (deceased April 1796), and Maria Manrique de Lara Polanco y Carrillo, daughter of the II Marquis of Lara, the grand son of Fermín Francisco de Carvajal-Vargas y Alarcón, born in Chile, 1st duke of San Carlos and Grandee of Spain, being a Secretary of State, some sort of Prime Minister of Spain under the Absolutist Restauration in the times of King Fernando VII of Spain, (1784–1833). He was a member of the Royal Spanish Academy from 1814 to 1828 and, three times Mayordomo mayor to the King.

He was Viceroy of Navarra during part of the tear 1807, and Spanish ambassador in Paris, London and Lisbonne, Knight of the Military Order of Alcantara and other knighthoods in France, Naples, Prussia, Hungary, and Russia. In 1813 he drafted the Treaty of Valençay. He was also a Director of the problematic Banco de San Carlos, founded in 1782 by the French – Spanish financier Francisco Cabarrus, (1752–1810), father of famous French Revolution woman Madame Tallien, (31 July 1773 – 15 January 1835).

One daughter from his second marriage, Maria Luisa, married in Bordeaux, France, in 1821, aged 17, Vicente Pio Osorio de Moscoso, (1801–1864), aged 20 and the holder of 14 Grandees of Spain.

Some references

A rather skimpy complementary but not well-known list of Viceroys and Spanish Governors or Representatives in Navarre of the Central Power in Madrid, rather good for the period 1512–1843.:

https://web.archive.org/web/20171010015723/http://www.asasve.es/portal/index.php?mod=article&cat=articulos&article=63

1771 births
1828 deaths
Dukes of Spain
Spanish captain generals
Spanish diplomats
Knights of the Order of Alcántara
Members of the Royal Spanish Academy
Government ministers of Spain
Grandees of Spain
Ambassadors of Spain to the United Kingdom of Great Britain and Ireland